Thelgetra is a genus of beetles in the family Cerambycidae, containing the following species:

 Thelgetra adusta (Burmeister, 1865)
 Thelgetra latipennis Thomson, 1864

References

Pteroplatini